Awaroa River in New Zealand may refer to:

 Awaroa River (Far North), in Far North District
 Awaroa River (Kaipara), in Kaipara District
 Awaroa River (Waikato River tributary), in Waikato District
 Awaroa River (Kawhia Harbour tributary), in Ōtorohanga District
 Awaroa River (Tasman), in Tasman District